Gibbula multicolor, common name the multicoloured topshell, is a species of sea snail, a marine gastropod mollusk in the family Trochidae, the top snails.

Description
The height of the shell attains 6½ mm, its diameter 7 mm. The small, narrowly perforated shell has a conoidal shape with five whorls. The first is whitish-rosy, the following white, with reddish flammules and spots of green and bluish, especially at the ridges. The surface of the whorls is marked with very fine spiral and vertical striae, and 2 elevated carinae. The body whorl contains three keels. The base of the shell is red with a spiral series of green streaks, concentrically striate. The aperture is suboval and smooth within. The columella is white.

(Description of Gibbula fucata) The height of the shell attains 5.6 mm, its diameter 7.3 mm. The elevated shell has a helicoid shape. Its apex is red, the rest variously spotted, streaked and blotched with Indian red, pale yellow, light green and brown. The 2½ nuclear whorls are well rounded and smooth. The postnuclear whorls are marked by four, very strong, rounded, equal, and equally spaced, spiral cords, of which the first is at the summit and the fourth at the periphery. On the last turn the cord at the summit becomes obsolete. In addition to the spiral sculpture the whorls are marked by very retractively slanting, closely spaced lines of growth. The periphery of the body whorl is rendered decidedly angulated by the spiral cord. The base of the shell is short, well rounded, marked on the posterior fourth by six, narrow, flattened, spiral bands and between these and the umbilical chink by seven additional bands of about double the width of the former. The umbilicus is covered with a white callus. The aperture is subcircular and very oblique. The outer lip is thin at the edge and thick within. The columella is strong and decidedly curved. The parietal wall is covered by a moderately thick callus.

(Description as Stomatella biporcata) The shell is turbinate and subdepressed. Its color is red and white, obscurely variegated. It is transversely sulcate. The acuminate spire contains four whorls, the last with two prominent ridges. The subquadrate aperture is pearly within. The inner lip is nearly straight. The outer lip is bi-angulate in the middle. The umbilicus is covered by a callus.

This is a small red species, with two rounded ridges on the body whorl and with a subquadrate aperture.

Distribution
This marine species occurs off the southern coast of South Africa and off Australia.

References

 Kilburn, R.N. & Rippey, E. (1982) Sea Shells of Southern Africa. Macmillan South Africa, Johannesburg, xi + 249 pp. page(s): 41
 Steyn, D.G. & Lussi, M. (1998) Marine Shells of South Africa. An Illustrated Collector’s Guide to Beached Shells. Ekogilde Publishers, Hartebeespoort, South Africa, ii + 264 pp. page(s): 20
 Adams, A. 1850. An arrangement of Stomatellidae, including the characters of a new genus Cumingia, with some additional generic characters. Proceedings of the Zoological Society of London 1850(18): 29–40, pl. 8
 Hedley, C. 1907. The Mollusca of Mast Head Reef, Capricorn Group, Queensland, part II. Proceedings of the Linnean Society of New South Wales 32: 476–513, pls 16-21
 Tomlin, J.R. le B. 1921. Six new marine shells from South Africa. Journal of Conchology 16: 215–217, pl. 8
  Branch, G.M. et al. (2002). Two Oceans. 5th impression. David Philip, Cate Town & Johannesburg
 Herbert D.G. (2015). An annotated catalogue and bibliography of the taxonomy, synonymy and distribution of the Recent Vetigastropoda of South Africa (Mollusca). Zootaxa. 4049(1): 1–98

External links
 Gastropods.com: Gibbula multicolor$

multicolor
Gastropods described in 1848